Robert Shirley, Viscount Tamworth (28 December 1692 – 5 July 1714) of Staunton Harold, Leicestershire, was an English nobleman and politician.

Robert Shirley was the eldest son of Hon. Robert Shirley (1673–1699) and his wife Anne Ferrers (d. 1698), and was born at Staunton Harold Hall. He inherited Tamworth Castle and other estates in Staffordshire upon his mother's death, and became heir apparent to his grandfather, Lord Ferrers of Chartley, when his father died the following year. He was styled Viscount Tamworth after 1711, when his grandfather was created Earl Ferrers.

When Sir Geoffrey Palmer, Member of Parliament for Leicestershire was forced by straitened finances to step down at the 1713 election, Tamworth was put forth by the Tories to replace him. At the time, the Tories held both Leicestershire seats; thorough canvassing on the part of Tamworth and some judicious payments quieted the Whig opposition, and Tamworth and the sitting member, Sir Thomas Cave, were returned without a poll. In the new Parliament, he was teller in favour of a supply bill on 22 June to grant Queen Anne 32 years of additional duties on various goods. Two weeks later, he was, like his father, stricken by smallpox and died on 5 July. He was buried at Staunton Harold. He left his estates, including Tamworth Castle, to his sister Elizabeth, who later married James Compton, 5th Earl of Northampton, and his personal property to his aunt, Lady Barbara Shirley (d. 1768).

References

1692 births
1714 deaths
British courtesy viscounts
British MPs 1713–1715
Deaths from smallpox
Heirs apparent who never acceded
Members of the Parliament of Great Britain for Leicestershire